Barbara Jean Gillam  is an Australian psychologist. She is Emeritus and Scientia Professor at the University of New South Wales.

Gillam received a PhD from the Australian National University in 1964 for her thesis "Space perception with aniseikonic lenses: A study of stereoscopic vision".

Her work has been in the area of perception and vision.

Awards and honours 
Gillam was awarded a Guggenheim Fellowship in 1985.

She was elected a Fellow of the Academy of the Social Sciences in Australia in 1994 and in 2017 became a Fellow of the Royal Society of New South Wales.

References 

Living people
Year of birth missing (living people)
Australian psychologists
Australian National University alumni
Academic staff of the University of New South Wales
Fellows of the Academy of the Social Sciences in Australia